"Monday's Child" is one of many fortune-telling songs, popular as nursery rhymes for children. It is supposed to tell a child's character or future from their day of birth and to help young children remember the seven days of the week. As with many nursery rhymes, there are many versions. It has a Roud Folk Song Index number of 19526.

Lyrics
The following is a common modern version:

Monday's child is fair of face,
Tuesday's child is full of grace.
Wednesday's child is full of woe,
Thursday's child has far to go.
Friday's child is loving and giving,
Saturday's child works hard for a living.
And the child born on the Sabbath day
Is bonny and blithe, good and gay.

Origins
This rhyme was first recorded in A. E. Bray's Traditions of Devonshire (Volume II, pp. 287–288) in 1838 and was collected by James Orchard Halliwell in the mid-19th century. The tradition of fortune telling by days of birth is much older. Thomas Nashe recalled stories told to children in Suffolk in the 1570s which included "what luck eurie [every] one should have by the day of the weeke he was borne on".

There was considerable variation and debate about the exact attributes of each day and even over the days. Halliwell had 'Christmas Day' instead of the Sabbath. Unlike modern versions in which "Wednesday's child is full of woe", an early incarnation of this rhyme appeared in a multi-part fictional story in a chapter appearing in Harper's Weekly on September 17, 1887, in which "Friday's child is full of woe", perhaps reflecting traditional superstitions associated with bad luck on Friday – as many Christians associated Friday with the Crucifixion. The fates of Thursday's and Saturday's children were also exchanged and Sunday's child is "happy and wise" instead of "blithe and good".

Music 
The rhyme was set by John Rutter for choir a cappella in the collection Five Childhood Lyrics, first published in 1974.

Literature 
In Mary Poppins Comes Back, a few lines of the nursery rhyme are briefly mentioned.

Cartoonist Charles Addams named Wednesday Addams of his Addams Family after this rhyme. The line "Wednesday's Child Is Full of Woe" is the title of the first episode of the 2022 TV series Wednesday based on the character, which also quotes the rhyme in the episode.

Margaret Atwood's novel The Testaments mentions the Wednesday and Thursday lines as part of a rhyme one of the narrators had heard from her mother as a child.

In Catherine Storr's Clever Polly and the Stupid Wolf (1955), Polly and the wolf have an argument about how the rhyme ought to go. Wolf's version is about how tasty children are, or how you should eat them.

In James Joyce's novel Ulysses, brothel worker Zoe Higgins quotes the line about Thursday's child to Stephen Dedalus upon learning he was born on a Thursday, the same weekday the novel is set on.

See also

 Tuesday's Child (disambiguation)
 Wednesday's Child (disambiguation)
 Thursday's Child (disambiguation)
 Friday's Child (disambiguation)
 "Saturday's Child"
 Sunday's Child

References

External links
 Day of the week calculator from Ancestor Search

English nursery rhymes
Year of song unknown
Songwriter unknown
English folk songs
English children's songs
Traditional children's songs